Polzeath (meaning dry creek) is a small seaside resort village in the civil parish of St Minver in Cornwall, England, United Kingdom.

Polzeath has a sandy beach and is popular with holiday-makers and surfers. At exceptionally high spring tides the sea floods the car park at the top of the beach.

Polzeath beach is patrolled by lifeguards during the summer and is described on the RNLI website as "a wide, flat beach with some shelter from winds, it sees good quality surf and is quite often extremely crowded".

Dolphins may sometimes be spotted in the bay and the coastline north of Polzeath is a good area for seeing many types of birds including corn buntings and puffins.

The main street runs along the seafront and has a parade of shops catering for holidaymakers and residents. There are pubs, cafés, restaurants, a caravan site and several camping sites in the immediate area. The road rises up steep hills at both ends of the seafront, towards the village of Trebetherick to the southwest and New Polzeath to the northeast.

The South West Coast Path runs from Daymer Bay in the South through Polzeath and up to Pentire Head in the North.

Geography
The catchment surrounding Polzeath is approximately 40,900 hectares and is drained by several streams. The Polzeath Brook stream rises near St Minver  to the east, and with several tributaries drains farmland before flowing through the middle of the Valley Caravan Park campsite and into the sea across Polzeath beach.  The Trenant Stream is 900m long and also crosses the beach, this time entering from the north east corner. There is also a small stream one and a half kilometres long, which flows onto Pentireglaze beach (also known as Baby Bay) which is at the northern end of Polzeath beach but is separated from it at high tide by Slipper Point.

Shilla Mill at the edge of Polzeath, stands at the confluence of the streams. Built around 1590 it ceased working as a mill in 1885 and was converted into a house.

History
In 1911 a Methodist chapel was built on the road towards Trebetherick at Chapel Corner. The original building was demolished in 1932 when the village street was widened and a new chapel was opened on 15 April 1933. Since 2006 the chapel has been called the Tubestation and is an active church with services every Sunday. The rest of the week it is a surfers cafe.

Until 1934 the main street through the village crossed the stream by means of a ford and a footbridge was provided for pedestrians although this was sometimes washed away by winter storms. For vehicles the road surface stopped short of the ford and cars splashed through the water on a sandy area occasionally causing vehicles to become stuck in the sand. In 1934 the current road bridge was built with a low wall separating the road from the sandy beach.

During World War II the beach would, alongside other beaches in Cornwall, have barbed wire on it in preparation for a German naval invasion.

The winter storms of 2014 changed the topography of the beach creating a sand bar up to 1m high located at approximately the high tide mark, a feature that was not previously recorded. This was gradually washed away so that by 2019 the beach had returned to the even slope visible in pictures up to 2014.

Economy
Tourism developed in the 19th and 20th centuries to be the most significant part of the local economy. UK Prime minister David Cameron and his wife holidayed there from 2010 to 2015.

Bathing water quality is measured at Polzeath by the Environment Agency with measurements being taken between May and September each year. The quality was rated as "excellent" in 2020 based on measurements taken between 2016 and 2019.

Literary associations

Polzeath was a favourite haunt of the poet laureate, Sir John Betjeman, and is celebrated in some of his verse. Another poet, Laurence Binyon, wrote the Remembrance Day ode For the Fallen in 1914 while sitting on The Rumps, Polzeath (or "Polseath" as it was called), during World War I.

In the first of Enid Blyton's Famous Five novels, the eponymous children express disappointment that their holiday will not be spent at Polzeath as usual.

The cartoonist Posy Simmonds created a fictitious place in Cornwall called "Tresoddit". When the BBC made the short film Tresoddit for Easter in 1991, it was filmed in and around Polzeath.

The BBC adaptation of Winston Graham's Poldark series of books filmed some scenes at Pentireglaze. In his book Poldark's Cornwall Graham described this as "an area which could hardly have changed in a century".

Notable people
Edgar Anstey (1917-2009), Civil Service psychologist lived in Polzeath from 1977 and died there.

See also

Trebetherick
Wadebridge
Pentire Point
River Camel

References

External links
 

 Local government census report, 2004
 Cornwall Record Office Online Catalogue for Polzeath

Villages in Cornwall
Beaches of Cornwall
Seaside resorts in Cornwall
Populated coastal places in Cornwall